Irapé Dam, the tallest dam in Brazil, is an embankment dam on the Jequitinhonha River in the state of Minas Gerais. The dam was constructed between 2002 and 2006 for the purpose of hydroelectric power generation.

History
In 1963, the Jequitinhonha River was studied for its hydroelectric potential and the studies were reviewed in 1984. Brazilian power company CEMIG won the bid to build the Irapé Dam in 1998. Construction on the dam began in September 2002 and in September of that year, the power plant was officially renamed Juscelino Kubitschek Power Plant, after the former President of Brazil. The river diversion was complete by April 2003 with two  diameter tunnels; one  in length and the other . The dam's reservoir began to fill in December 2005 and the first of the power plant's generators was commissioned on 20 July 2006. The second generator was commissioned in August and the third in October 2006. At the time of its completion it was the tallest dam in Brazil.

Design
It is built within a steep canyon just upstream of a bend in the river. Controlling overflow are three  spillway tunnels. Each diverts water from the reservoir to the eastern side of a bend in the river. Two of the tunnels are located high above the valley while one is at an intermediate height.

Juscelino Kubitschek Power Plant

See also

List of tallest dams in the world
List of power stations in Brazil

References

Dams completed in 2006
Dams in Minas Gerais
Rock-filled dams